Juan Martínez Oliver (born 4 February 1962 in Almeria) is a former Spanish professional road bicycle racer. He won a stage in the 1988 Tour de France. He also competed in the two events at the 1996 Summer Olympics.

Major results

1987
Memorial Manuel Galera
1988
Fuengirola - Mijas
Tour de France:
Winner stage 21

References

External links
 

1962 births
Living people
Sportspeople from Almería
Spanish male cyclists
Spanish Tour de France stage winners
Olympic cyclists of Spain
Cyclists at the 1996 Summer Olympics
Cyclists from Andalusia